Macarlar is a village in the Gerede District of Bolu Province, Turkey. Its population is 66 (2021).

References

Villages in Gerede District